Norbert Palásthy (born 10 February 1981 in Vác) is a retired Hungarian football player who last played for Érdi VSE.

Club career

Budapest Honved
He made his debut on 7 July 2007 against FC Sopron in a match that ended 1–0.

Club honours

Ferencvárosi TC
Hungarian National Championship I:
Runners-up: 2002–03
Hungarian Cup:
Winners: 2002–03
Hungarian Super Cup:
Runners-up: 2002–03

Vác-Újbuda LTC
Hungarian National Championship II:
Winner: 2005–06
3rd place: 2004–05

Budapest Honvéd FC
Hungarian Cup:
Winner: 2008–09
Runners-up: 2007–08
Hungarian Super Cup:
Runners-up: 2007, 2009

References
Budapest Honved Official Website
Player profile at HLSZ

1981 births
Living people
People from Vác
Hungarian footballers
Association football forwards
Ferencvárosi TC footballers
FC Fót footballers
Rákospalotai EAC footballers
Vác FC players
Budapest Honvéd FC players
Paksi FC players
Mezőkövesdi SE footballers
Egri FC players
Sportspeople from Pest County